Oklahoma Children's Hospital at OU Health (formerly known as The Children's Hospital of Oklahoma and The Children's Hospital at OU Medicine) is a nationally ranked, freestanding acute care women's and children's hospital in Oklahoma City, Oklahoma. It is affiliated with the University of Oklahoma College of Medicine. The hospital features all private rooms that consist of 246 pediatric beds. The hospital provides comprehensive pediatric specialties and subspecialties to infants, children, teens, and young adults aged 0–21 throughout the region. The hospital also sometimes treats adults that require pediatric care. The hospital has a rooftop helipad and is an ACS verified level 1  pediatric trauma center, the only one in Oklahoma. The hospital features a regional pediatric intensive-care unit and an American Academy of Pediatrics verified level IV neonatal intensive care unit.

History 
In April 2011, the Children's Atrium was opened to the public and now serves as the main entrance to Oklahoma Children's Hospital. The Emergency Room entrance was moved to N.E. 13th Street. Oklahoma Children's Hospital has an affiliated physicians practice as part of OU Health Physicians. The doctors work in over 50 pediatric specialties. Oklahoma Children's Hospital is home to the Mother & Baby Center, which is known for its high risk specialty care for mothers and newborns. Oklahoma Children's Hospital and the Mother & Baby Center is a Certified Baby-Friendly Hospital.

In 2015 the hospital purchased a new helicopter for critically ill neonatal intensive care and pediatric intensive care transport. The new helicopter was named "Air Kids One" by hospital officials.

In July 2019 the hospital announced that they would be expanding their pediatric intensive care unit (PICU) to another space in the hospital with a 34-bed capacity. The space that was formerly the PICU was to be converted into a cardiac intensive care unit.

In early 2020 the hospital implemented temporary strict visitation protocols in order to help prevent the spread in hospital settings. The change prohibited any visitors under 18 and only allowed one parent per patient in the hospital.

In 2020 to help deal with the surge of adult SARS-Cov-2 the hospital opened up its pediatric units to adults with the disease. The hospital also expanded their overall pediatric limit from 21 to 26 to supplement the adult hospitals in the area. Adults on the unit were treated by pediatric nurses and doctors during their stay.

In 2022, after Republicans in the Oklahoma Legislature introduced legislation to block $39.4 million dollars in federal funding granted to the hospital under the American Rescue Plan Act unless it ceased providing gender affirming healthcare to trans youth, the hospital announced it would cease providing gender affirming healthcare to trans youth.

About

Care Units 
Oklahoma Children's Hospital has the only American Academy of Pediatrics verified level IV neonatal intensive care unit (NICU) in the state and the greater region of the midwest. Critically ill newborns from all over the region are transported to the NICU from smaller hospitals that are not equipped to treat these patients.

Oklahoma Children's Hospital features the only 24/7 pediatric emergency room in Oklahoma City and the only American College of Surgeons verified level 1 pediatric trauma center in the state of Oklahoma. The verification was renewed in January, 2020.

Awards 
In 2010, the Pediatric Urology Department at Oklahoma Children's Hospital was ranked as the 14th best Urology Department in the nation by U.S. News & World Report. In 2012, the Mother & Baby Center at Oklahoma Children's Hospital received an "Excellence in Patient Care" award from the healthcare firm Studer Group. In 2020, the Oklahoma Perinatal Quality Improvement Collaborative awarded the hospital the Spotlight Hospital Award because of the hospitals excellence in perinatal care.

Gallery

See also 
 University of Oklahoma College of Medicine
 List of children's hospitals in the United States
 Children's Hospital of Philadelphia
 OU Medical Center

References 

Hospitals in Oklahoma
Children's hospitals in the United States
Healthcare in Oklahoma
Hospital buildings completed in 2011
Hospitals established in 2011
Pediatric trauma centers
Women's hospitals